Olivia Gadecki (born 24 April 2002) is a professional tennis player from Australia. She has a career-high singles rank of world No. 144, reached on 20 February 2023, and a highest doubles rank of world No. 178, achieved on 8 November 2021.

She made her WTA Tour debut at the 2021 Gippsland Trophy, having received a wildcard into the main draw.

Personal life
Gadecki was born and raised on the Gold Coast where she started playing tennis at age three. She was considered a prodigious tennis talent as a junior and at the age of 12 was one of just 16 players from around the world invited to take part in the Longines Future Tennis Aces competition in Paris on the eve of the 2014 French Open. Gadecki attended Southport State High School throughout her teenage years.

Career

2016–2020: First steps
Gadecki made her main-draw debut on the ITF Circuit in Brisbane, in September 2016.

2021: WTA Tour debut
In January 2021, Gadecki made the second round of the Australian Open qualifying. She was awarded a wildcard into the Gippsland Trophy, where she made her WTA Tour main-draw debut.

In February, Gadecki won her first WTA Tour singles main-draw match at the Phillip Island Trophy. She followed this up with her first top-10 win, defeating the top seed, former Australian Open champion and world No. 4, Sofia Kenin. With Gadecki's career-high ranking being No. 988 in the world, this was Kenin's worst defeat by ranking on the WTA Tour. Gadecki lost in the third round. The following week, she re-entered onto the WTA rankings at No. 642. In May 2021, Gadecki won her first professional singles title in Turkey.

In August 2021, she won the singles and doubles titles at Vigo, Spain. It was her second singles title and fifth doubles title.

On 20 September 2021, Gadecki debuted in the Australian top 10 in singles and doubles rankings. She ended the year with a singles ranking of 238.

2022: Top 200
Gadecki did not enter the 2022 Australian Open due to the requirement for all played to be vaccinated against COVID-19 and her anti-vaccination stance.

In April 2022, Gadecki broke into the top 200, after reaching three finals from four Australian Pro Tour appearances.

2023: United Cup and Australian Open debuts, first major win, top 150
She made her debut at the 2023 Australian Open as a wildcard. She defeated Polina Kudermetova in the first round. As a result she reached the top 150 at world No. 144 on 20 February 2023.

Performance timelines

Only main-draw results in WTA Tour, Grand Slam tournaments, Fed Cup/Billie Jean King Cup and Olympic Games are included in win–loss records.

Singles
Current after the 2023 Australian Open.

Doubles

ITF Circuit finals

Single: 9 (2 titles, 7 runner-ups)

Doubles: 10 (6 titles, 4 runner-ups)

Head-to-head record

Wins over top 10 players

References

External links
 
 
 Olivia Gadecki at Tennis Australia

2002 births
Living people
Sportspeople from the Gold Coast, Queensland
Tennis people from the Gold Coast
Australian female tennis players
Australian people of Polish descent
21st-century Australian women